Euzophera mabes is a species of snout moth in the genus Euzophera. It was described by Harrison Gray Dyar Jr. in 1914, and is known from Panama.

References

Moths described in 1914
Phycitini
Moths of Central America